Al Nisr Publishing is a company based in Dubai, UAE. The company is a part of Al Tayer Group. It was established in 1985 by Obaid Al Tayer, Abdullah Al Rostamani and Juma Al Majid. It employs 1,050 people and has branches in Manila, Bahrain, Abu Dhabi and Sharjah. It publishes Gulf News, a leading English-language newspaper in the region and among the most important newspapers in the UAE.

Publications
All publications are in the English-language.

Gulf News, daily newspaper
Xpress free weekly tabloid
Property monthly, B-to-B property magazine	
Freehold monthly, B-to-C property magazine
InsideOut, monthly interiors and property magazine	
Friday, weekly family magazine	
Tabloid, weekly entertainment magazine	
wheels, weekly auto magazine
Watchtime Middle East, luxury watch magazine

External links 
Gulf News

Mass media in Dubai
Newspaper companies of the United Arab Emirates